Hasmine Killip (born Hasmine Bulaong Formalejo) is a Filipino actress.  Killip starred in the film Ordinary People, a performance that garnered her critical acclaim and multiple awards including "Best Actress" at the 2016 Asia Pacific Screen Awards.

External links

Living people
Filipino film actresses
Year of birth missing (living people)
Place of birth missing (living people)
Asia Pacific Screen Award winners